The Hong Kong Masters is a professional invitational snooker tournament which was initially held for six editions in the 1980s, before being revived in 2017.

The tournament was originally one of several established in Asia in the 1980s by Barry Hearn’s Matchroom organisation. The event became part of the World Series of Snooker in 1987. The final edition was in 1988, before running in 1990 as the World Series Challenge and 1991 as the Hong Kong Challenge. World Snooker announced it would be held again in 2017.

Winners

References

 
Snooker non-ranking competitions
International sports competitions hosted by Hong Kong
Recurring sporting events established in 1983
1983 establishments in Hong Kong
Cue sports in Hong Kong